A helium release valve, helium escape valve or gas escape valve is a feature found on some diving watches intended for saturation diving using helium based breathing gas.

When saturation divers operate at great depths, they live under pressure in a saturation habitat with an atmosphere containing helium or hydrogen. Since helium atoms are the smallest natural gas particles, they are able to diffuse into the watch, past the seals which are able to prevent ingress of larger molecules such as water. This is not a problem as long as the watch remains under external pressure, but when decompressing, a pressure difference builds up between the trapped gas inside the watch case and the environment. Depending on the construction of the watch case and crystal, this effect can cause damage to the watch, such as the crystal popping off, as diving watches are designed primarily to withstand external pressure.

Some watch manufacturers manage this effect by simply making the case strong enough to withstand the internal pressure, but Rolex and Doxa S.A. approached the problem by creating the helium escape valve in the 1960s (first introduced in the Rolex Submariner/Sea-Dweller and the Doxa Conquistador): A small, spring-loaded one-way valve is fitted in the watch case that opens when the differential between internal and external pressure reaches is sufficient to overcome the spring force. As a result, the valve releases the gases trapped inside the watch case during decompression, preventing damage to the watch. The original idea for using a one-way valve came from Robert A. Barth, a US Navy diver who pioneered saturation diving during the US Navy Genesis and SEALAB missions led by Dr. George F. Bond.

Automatic helium release valves usually don't need any manual operation, but some are backed up by a screw-down crown in the side of the watch, which is unscrewed at the start of decompression to allow the valve to operate.

Helium release valves can primarily be found on diving watches featuring a  water resistance rating greater than 300 m (1000 ft). ISO 6425 defines a diver's watch for mixed-gas diving as: A watch required to be resistant during diving in water to a depth of at least 100 m and to be unaffected by the overpressure of the breathing gas. Models that feature a helium release valve include most of the Omega Seamaster series, Rolex Sea Dweller, Tudor watches Pelagos, some dive watches from the Citizen Watch Co., Ltd, Breitling, Girard-Perregaux, Anonimo, Panerai, Mühle Rasmus by Nautische Instrumente Mühle Glashütte, Deep Blue , all watches produced by Enzo Mechana, Aegir Watches and selected Doxa, selected Victorinox models, Oris models, TAG Heuer Aquaracer models, and the DEL MAR Professional Dive 1000 watch. Other watch manufacturers such as Seiko and Citizen Watch Co., Ltd still offer high-level dive watches that are guaranteed safe against the effects of mixed-gas diving without needing an additional opening in the case in the form of a release valve. This is normally achieved through the use of special gaskets and monocoque case construction instead of using the more common screw down case-backs.

ISO 6425 divers' watches standard for mixed-gas diving decompression test
The standards and features for diving watches are regulated by the ISO 6425 – Divers' watches international standard. ISO 6425 testing of the water resistance or water-tightness and resistance at a water overpressure as it is officially defined is fundamentally different from non-dive watches, because every single watch has to be tested.
ISO 6425 provides specific additional requirements for testing of diver's watches for mixed-gas diving.
One additional requirement is a test of operation at a gas overpressure. The watch is subject to the overpressure of gas which will actually be used, i.e. 125% of the rated pressure, for 15 days. Then a rapid reduction in pressure to the atmospheric pressure shall be carried out in a time not exceeding 3 minutes. After this test, the watch shall function correctly. An electronic watch shall function normally during and after the test. A mechanical watch shall function normally after the test (the power reserve normally being less than 15 days).

Gallery

References

Swiss patent CH492246A Montre étanche, MONTRES ROLEX SA, ANDRE ZIBACH, 6 November 1967
Technical Perspective What Saturation Diving Really Means (And What Watchmakers Do About It) It's all about the helium, and not getting killed. Jack Forster, 11 July 11 2017, hodinkee.com

Diving equipment